Gasson Hall is a building on the campus of Boston College in Chestnut Hill, Massachusetts. Designed by Charles Donagh Maginnis in 1908, the hall has influenced the development of Collegiate Gothic architecture in North America. Gasson Hall is named after the 13th president of Boston College, Thomas I. Gasson, S.J., considered BC's "second founder."

History

In 1907, newly installed Boston College President Thomas I. Gasson, S.J., determined that BC's cramped, urban campus in Boston's South End was inadequate and unsuited for significant expansion. Inspired by John Winthrop's early vision of Boston as a "city upon a hill," he re-imagined Boston College as a world-renowned university and a beacon of Jesuit education. Less than a year after taking office, he purchased the Lawrence farm on Chestnut Hill, six miles west of the city. He organized an international competition for the design of the campus master plan and set about raising funds for the construction of the "new" university. Two years later, the competition winner was announced and construction began. From a field of entries by some of the most distinguished architects of the day, Charles Donagh Maginnis' proposal for an "Oxford in America" was selected.

Architectural description

Gasson Hall is a seminal example of Collegiate Gothic architecture in North America. Publication of its design in 1909—and praise from influential American Gothicist Ralph Adams Cram—helped establish Collegiate Gothic as the prevailing architectural style on American university campuses for much of the 20th century. Gasson Hall is credited for the typology of dominant Gothic towers in subsequent campus designs, including those at Princeton (Cleveland Tower, 1913–1917), Yale (Harkness Tower, 1917–1921), and Duke (Chapel Tower, 1930–1935).

Combining the Gothic style of his medieval precedent with the axes, balance and symmetry of the Beaux-Arts style, he proposed a vast complex of academic buildings set in a cruciform plan. The design suggested an enormous outdoor cathedral, with the long entry drive at the "nave," the main quadrangle at the "apse" and secondary quadrangles at the "transepts." At the "crossing", Maginnis placed the university's main building which he called "Recitation Hall". Using stone quarried on the site, the building was constructed at the highest point on Chestnut Hill, commanding a view of the surrounding landscape and the city to the east. Dominated by a soaring 200-foot bell tower, Recitation Hall was known simply as the "Tower Building" when it finally opened in 1913.

Maginnis' design broke from the traditional Oxbridge models that had inspired it—and that had till then characterized Gothic architecture on American campuses. In its unprecedented scale, Gasson Tower was conceived not as the belfry of a singular building, but as the crowning campanile of Maginnis' new "city upon a hill".

Renovation
Gasson Hall has been subject to major exterior renovations. The building's stone elements had been heavily weathered since the hall’s opening in 1913. Nearly every stone on the building had to be analyzed and documented for replacement. It was concluded that construction crews must replace nearly 99% of the building's decorative cast stones. The renovation consisted of several phases, the first focusing mainly on the building's 200 foot tall bell tower.

Crews attempted to replicate Gasson's Collegiate Gothic architecture by meticulously removing each of the cast stones and replacing them with exact replicas. Each of the tower's four prominent spires was removed via crane and shipped to a masonry company. The original spires were used to form molds. These molds were then used to create new stone spires, which could be attached to the building.

Work on the bell tower was completed in autumn 2008.

Work on the rest of the building was completed by September 2011.

See also
Collegiate Gothic
Gothic revival architecture

References

Boston College buildings
Gothic Revival architecture in Massachusetts
School buildings completed in 1908
Collegiate Gothic architecture in the United States
1908 establishments in Massachusetts